SNPSTR is a database of Snpstrs  (a microsatellite with one or more tightly linked SNPs).

See also
 Snpstr
Short tandem repeat
Microsatellite
Single-nucleotide polymorphism

References

External links
 http://www.imperial.ac.uk/theoreticalgenomics/data-software

Biological databases
Repetitive DNA sequences